Eureka Forbes Limited is an Indian multinational home appliances company based in Mumbai. It makes water purification devices, vacuum cleaners, air purification systems, and home security products.

History
Eureka Forbes was founded in 1982 as a 60:40 joint venture between Tata Group's Forbes & Company and Swedish manufacturer Electrolux. In 2001, Tata Group sold Forbes & Company to Shapoorji Pallonji Group and, four years later, Electrolux sold its 40% stake in Eureka Forbes to Forbes & Company.

In 2010, Eureka Forbes acquired a 25% stake in Swiss consumer products company Lux International. In 2013, Eureka Forbes increased its stake to become the controlling shareholder in Lux International.

In 2022, Advent International bought out Shapoorji Pallonji Group's entire stake in Eureka Forbes, after Eureka Forbes was separated from Forbes & Company and listed on the BSE.

Corporate Social Responsibilities
In 2000, the Eureka Forbes Institute of Environment (EFIE) was founded. It is a registered public charitable organization that creates and supports social initiatives.

Eureka Forbes in association with National Society for Equal Opportunities for the Handicapped NASEOH launched EuroAble, a call center manned by people with special needs. It is also involved with 'Nana Nani Parks', which provides recreational facilities for senior citizens, and has worked with World Vision to provide water filter units for free drinking water kiosks in public places. They also have initiated the 'Jagrut MumbaikarJagrut Mumbaikar' program, with the police and fire brigade, which provides self-help information for citizens.

Awards and recognition
In 2012, Eureka Forbes received three awards at the 6th Water Digest Awards for Best Domestic Water Purifier RO for Aquaguard Enhance Green RO, Best Domestic Water Purifier UV for Aquaguard Enhance UV and Best Water Purifier Award in the Storage Non-Electric category’ for AquaSure Amrit.
In 2015, Eureka Forbes was listed as India's 18th 'Best Places to Work For'.

External links

Companies based in Mumbai
Companies established in 1982
1982 establishments in Maharashtra
Indian companies established in 1982
Companies listed on the Bombay Stock Exchange